The River Skell is a  
tributary of the River Ure in North Yorkshire, England.

For its first  the river is known as Skell Beck. Descending from the moor the river enters Skell Gill, a narrow wooded valley. The river valley gradually broadens, but remains well wooded, passing the villages of Skelding and Grantley and the 17th century Grantley Hall.

The river enters Studley Royal Park and flows past Fountains Hall and the ruins of Fountains Abbey. Below the abbey the river was dammed in the 18th century to form an ornamental lake and water garden. Downstream from the park the river bed is porous rock that allows some or all of the flow to disappear underground. After this, the river re-emerges on the surface and enters the city of Ripon, and on the outskirts receives its largest tributary, the River Laver.

The name is from the Old Norse skjallr, meaning "resounding", from its swift and noisy course.  In the Middle Ages the river was known as "Heaven Water", presumably from its association with Fountains Abbey.

The flow of the River Skell has been measured at Alma Weir in Ripon, near to its confluence with the Ure since 1984.

References

External links 

Skell